Baby is a surname. Notable people with the surname include:

Benoît Baby (born 1983), French rugby union footballer
François Baby (politician) (1768–1852), political figure in Upper Canada
François Baby (businessman) (1733–1820), Canadian businessman
François Baby (legislative councillor) (1794–1864), seigneur, businessman, and legislative councillor
Jacques Baby (1731–1789), Canadian fur trader
James Baby (1763–1863), Canadian politician and judge, and son of Jacques Baby
Jean Baptiste Baby (1770–1852), Canadian politician and businessman, and son of Jacques Baby
K. J. Baby (born 1954), Indian writer and film director
Louis François Georges Baby (1832–1906), Canadian politician and judge
M. A. Baby (born 1954), Indian politician

See also 
 Baby (nickname) & given name
 Baby (disambiguation)